This list of black British writers includes those born in or associated with the UK.

A
 Michael Abbensetts (1938–2016)
 Diran Adebayo (born 1968) 
 Sade Adeniran (born 1960s)
 Lola Adesioye (living)
 Hakim Adi (living)
 Zoe Adjonyoh (born late 1970s)
 Rhammel Afflick (born 1994)
 John Agard (born 1949)
 Sandra Agard (living)
 Patience Agbabi (born 1965)
 Bola Agbaje (living)
 Toyin Agbetu (living)
 Yemi Ajibade (1929–2013)
 Kehinde Andrews (born 1983)
 Joan Anim-Addo (living)
 Raymond Antrobus (born 1986)
 Dean Atta (living)

B
 Bolu Babalola (born 1991)
 Yaba Badoe (born 1955)
 Francis Barber (?–1801)
 Simi Bedford (living)
 Linda Bellos (born 1950)
 Floella Benjamin (born 1949)
 Jay Bernard (born 1988)
 James Berry (1924–2017)
 Hannah Black (living)
 Malorie Blackman (born 1962)
 Valerie Bloom (born 1956)
 Paul Boakye (living)
 JJ Bola (living)
 Malika Booker (born 1970)
 Lloyd Bradley (born 1955)
 E. R. Braithwaite (1912–2016)
 Jean "Binta" Breeze (1956–2021)
 Petronella Breinburg (1927–2019) 
 Yvonne Brewster (born 1938)
 Constance Briscoe (born 1957)
 Barbara Burford (1944–2010)
 Margaret Busby (living)

C
 Candice Carty-Williams (born 1989)
 Gus Casely-Hayford (born 1964)
 Eddie Chambers (born 1960)
 Helen (charles) (living)
 Michaela Coel (born 1987)
 Merle Collins (born 1959)
 Ottobah Cugoano (c. 1757–after 1791)
 Patricia Cumper (born 1954)

D
 Fred D'Aguiar (born 1960)
 David Dabydeen (born 1955)
 Stella Dadzie (born 1952)
 Yrsa Daley-Ward (born 1989)
 Ferdinand Dennis (born 1956)
 Anni Domingo (born 1950s)
 Michael Donkor (born 1985)

E
 Reni Eddo-Lodge (born 1989)
 Yvvette Edwards (living)
 Zena Edwards (born 1960s)
 Obi Egbuna (1938–2014)
 Inua Ellams (born 1984)
 Buchi Emecheta (1944–2017)
 Cecile Emeke (living)
 Olaudah Equiano (c. 1745–1797)
 Ekow Eshun (born 1968)
 Kodwo Eshun (born 1967)
 Melanie Eusebe (born 1977)
 Diana Evans (born 1972)
 Bernardine Evaristo (born 1959)

F
 Aminatta Forna (born 1964)
 Pam Fraser Solomon (living)
 Lorna French (living)

G
 Mike Gayle (born 1970)
 Beryl Gilroy (1924–2001)
 Paul Gilroy (born 1956)
 Martin Glynn (born 1957)
 Salena Godden (living)
 Colin Grant (born 1961)
 debbie tucker green (living)
 Bonnie Greer (born 1948)
 Ukawsaw Gronniosaw (c. 1705–1775)

H
 Stuart Hall (1932–2014)
 Leila Hassan (born 1948)
 Victor Headley (born 1959)
 Julian Henriques (born 1951)
 Lenny Henry (born 1958)
 Talia Hibbert (living)
 Donald Hinds (born 1934)
 Afua Hirsch (born 1981)
 Jo Hodges (1959–2017)
 Darcus Howe (1943–2017)
 Marsha Hunt (born 1946)
 Ben Hunte (living)

I
 Theresa Ikoko (living)

J
 Sharna Jackson (living)
 Charlene James (living)
 C. L. R. James (1901–1989) 
 Lennie James (born 1965)
 Delia Jarrett-Macauley (born 1958)
 John Jea (1773–after 1817)
 Gus John (born 1945)
 Amryl Johnson (1944–2001)
 Catherine Johnson (born 1962)
 Linton Kwesi Johnson (born 1952)
 Claudia Jones (1915–1964)
 Evan Jones (1927–2012)
 Darren Jordon (born 1960)
 Anthony Joseph (born 1966)

K
 Jackie Kay (born 1961)
 Oonya Kempadoo (born 1966)
 Peter Kempadoo (1926–2019)
 Roshini Kempadoo (born 1959)
 Dorothy Koomson (born 1971)
 Kwame Kwei-Armah (born 1967)

L
 John La Rose (1927–2006)
 George Lamming (1927–2022)
 Patrice Lawrence (born 1960s)
 Marcia Layne (living)
 Kevin Le Gendre (living)
 Andrea Levy (1956–2019)
 Errol Lloyd (born 1943)
 Lesley Lokko (living)
 Adam Lowe (born 1985)
 John Lyons (born 1933)

M
 Karen McCarthy Woolf (born 1960s)
 Adewale Maja-Pearce (born 1953)
 Sarah Ladipo Manyika (born 1968)
 E. A. Markham (1939–2008)
 Una Marson (1905–1965)
 S. I. Martin (born 1961)
 Valerie Mason-John (born 1962)
 Mustapha Matura (1939–2019)
 Val McCalla (1943–2002)
 Jenny McLeod (born 1963)
 Michael McMillan (born 1962)
 Paul Mendez (born 1982)
 Kobena Mercer (born 1960)
 Bridget Minamore (born 1991)
 Dreda Say Mitchell (born 1965)
 Nadifa Mohamed (born 1981)
 Shujaa Moshesh (living)
 Shola Mos-Shogbamimu (born 1975)

N
 Courttia Newland (born 1973)
 Grace Nichols (born 1950)

O
 Michael Obiora (born 1986)
 Tolu Ogunlesi (born 1982)
 Chioma Okereke (living)
 Irenosen Okojie (living)
 Ben Okri (born 1959)
 Victor Oladokun (living)
 Lola Olufemi (born 1996)
 David Olusoga (born 1970)
 Rageh Omaar (born 1967)
 Nuzo Onoh (born 1962)
 Onyeka (living)
 Diriye Osman (born 1983)
 Sharon Dodua Otoo (born 1972)
 Derek Owusu (born 1988)
 Helen Oyeyemi (born 1984)

P
 Annie Yellowe Palma (born 1962)
 Nii Parkes (born 1974)
 Cass Pennant (born 1958)
 Caryl Phillips (born 1958)
 Mike Phillips (born 1941)
 Trevor Phillips (born 1953)
 Woodrow Phoenix (living)
 Winsome Pinnock (born 1961)
 Hannah Pool (born 1974)
 Mary Prince (1788–after 1833)

R
 Barry Reckord (1926–2011)
 Joan Riley (born 1958)
 Na'ima B. Robert (born 1977)
 Roger Robinson (living)
 Nicola Rollock (living)
 Jacob Ross (born 1956)
 Leone Ross (born 1969)
 Jacqueline Rudet (born 1962)
 Shane Ryan (born 1969)

S
 Layla Saad (living)
 Amon Saba Saakana (living)
 Michael Salu (living)
 Ignatius Sancho (c. 1729–1780)
 June Sarpong (born 1977)
 Mary Seacole (1805–1881) 
 Sam Selvon (1923–1994)
 Kadija Sesay (born 1962)
 Warsan Shire (born 1988)
 Andra Simons (living)
 Lemn Sissay (born 1967)
 Dorothea Smartt (born 1963)
 Zadie Smith (born 1975)
 Ade Solanke (living)
 Frances-Anne Solomon (born 1966)
 Paula B. Stanic (living)
 Nick Stone (born 1966)
 Andrea Stuart (born 1962)
 SuAndi (born 1951)
 Maud Sulter (1960–2008)
 Yinka Sunmonu (born 1962)
 Luke Sutherland (born 1971)

T
 Yvonne Thompson (living)
 Joanna Traynor (living)
 Carol Tulloch (living)

U
 Catherine Ugwu (born 1964)
 Yesomi Umolu (born 1983/1984)

V
 Ivan Van Sertima (1935–2009) 
 Patrick Vernon (born 1961)

W
 Kit de Waal (born 1960)
 Marc Wadsworth (living)
 Jackie Walker (born 1954)
 Jools Walker (living)
 Onyekachi Wambu (born 1960)
 Robert Wedderburn (1762–1835/1836?)
 Alex Wheatle (born 1963)
 Verna Wilkins (born 1940s)
 Francis Williams (ca. 1700–1770)
 Henry Sylvester Williams (1867 or 1869–1911)
 Roy Williams (born 1968)
 Doirean Wilson (living)
 T-Bone Wilson (living)
 Ken Wiwa (1968–2016)
 Trix Worrell (born 1959)

Y
 Gary Younge (born 1969)

Z
 Benjamin Zephaniah (born 1958)

See also
 Black British people

 
Black
Lists of black people